Benfleet railway station is on the London, Tilbury and Southend line, serving the towns of South Benfleet and Canvey Island, Essex. Its three-letter station code is BEF.

It was opened in 1855. The station and all trains serving it are currently operated by c2c.

Description 
The station is located between Ferry Road and Station Road with the main building located on the Ferry Road side. This houses the ticket office. The ticket office has four serving positions. The station also has 3 self-service ticket machines that accept cash or card payment.

Entry to the platforms is via four automatic ticket gates. On the Station Road side of the building there is a secondary entrance which is open during the weekday peak periods; this has three barriers and the fourth self-service ticket machine.

The two platforms are reached by fixed staircases. Step-free access is provided to and from both platforms by the use of automatic gates located at the country-end of the platforms.

In 2007 the ticket office was refurbished, and a new front ticket office counter was built. It has one lower ticket office window for wheelchair users.

There was formerly a siding to the east of the station on the 'up' London bound side, this was extant in 1969.

Services 
The typical Monday-Friday off-peak service frequency is:

 4 tph (trains per hour) westbound towards London Fenchurch Street, of which:
2 tph call at all stations via 
2 tph call at all stations via the  branch (these trains are overtaken by via Basildon services)
 4 tph eastbound towards , of which:
 2 tph terminate at 
 2 tph continue to Shoeburyness

References

External links

Railway stations in Essex
DfT Category C2 stations
Transport in Castle Point
Former London, Tilbury and Southend Railway stations
Railway stations in Great Britain opened in 1855
Railway stations served by c2c
South Benfleet